The George is a Grade II listed public house at 28 Hammersmith Broadway, Hammersmith, London.

It was built in 1911, by the architects Nowell Parr and A E Kates.

It is now a branch of the bar/restaurant chain Belushi's.

References

Pubs in the London Borough of Hammersmith and Fulham
Grade II listed buildings in the London Borough of Hammersmith and Fulham
Grade II listed pubs in London
Buildings by Nowell Parr
Hammersmith